"Let's Have a Kiki" is a song by American band Scissor Sisters. The song was released as the third single from their fourth studio album Magic Hour. It was released on September 11, 2012 in the United States and September 18, 2012 in the United Kingdom. The song was written by Jason Sellards, Scott Hoffman, Ana Lynch and produced by Scissor Sisters. The single reached number 119 on the official UK Singles Chart, following their performance on Strictly Come Dancing in October 2012.

Background
A "kiki" is a meeting of friends for the purpose of gossiping and chit-chat, used mainly in gay culture.

Music video
A music video to accompany the release of "Let's Have a Kiki" was first released onto YouTube on July 27, 2012 at a total length of four minutes and four seconds. The video shows the band members perform a dance routine in a hall for the clip, which is labeled as an "Instructional Video".  The video was directed by Vern Moen and choreographed by Brad Landers. On November 26, 2019, Billboard included it in the Top 100 Greatest Music Videos of the 2010s, coming in at #79.

Promotion
Scissor Sisters performed "Let's Have a Kiki" on The Wendy Williams Show, as well as internationally in Australia on Sunrise, and in the United Kingdom on Strictly Come Dancing.

Cover versions
"Let's Have a Kiki" inspired several viral video parodies from the drag queen community. Lady Bunny & Bianca Del Rio, Sherry Vine, and Willam Belli have all released their own versions of the song. Willam Belli released his version as a single, featuring Rhea Litré, from his album The Wreckoning.

In November 2012 a cover version of the song, in a mash-up with "Turkey Lurkey Time", was featured on the Fox TV series Glee, performed by Sarah Jessica Parker, Chris Colfer, and Lea Michele in the "Thanksgiving" episode.

Track listing

Credits and personnel
Lead vocals: Scissor Sisters
Producers: Scissor Sisters
Lyrics: Jason Sellards, Scott Hoffman, Ana Lynch

Charts

Weekly charts

Year-end charts

Release history

See also
 List of number-one dance singles of 2012 (U.S.)

References

2012 singles
2012 songs
LGBT-related songs
Polydor Records singles
Scissor Sisters songs
Songs written by Ana Matronic
Songs written by Babydaddy
Songs written by Jake Shears